Qinzhou was a province of Tang and Five-Dynasty China. It was named for the former state of Qin and occupied the southeastern area of present-day Gansu. It was variously centered at Shanggui (modern Tianshui, whose Qinzhou District bears its name) and Changji (modern Qin'an).

References

 

Prefectures of Former Shu
Prefectures of Later Shu
Prefectures of the Sui dynasty
Prefectures of the Tang dynasty
Prefectures of Later Tang
Prefectures of Later Jin (Five Dynasties)
Prefectures of Later Zhou
Prefectures of the Song dynasty
Prefectures of the Jin dynasty (1115–1234)
Prefectures of the Yuan dynasty
Prefectures of the Ming dynasty
Prefectures of the Qing dynasty
Former prefectures in Gansu